Joanna Gabrielle "Pooky" Quesnel (born 30 April 1966) is an English actress, screenwriter and singer.

Early life
Quesnel was born and raised in Eccles, Lancashire, along with her five siblings. Her father was born in Trinidad. She read English at Oxford University before spending a year at the Academy of Live and Recorded Arts. In the 1980s, she performed in Humphrey Carpenter's Vile Bodies band at the Ritz Hotel, and performed in a tribute concert to him following his death in 2005. In 2003, she began screenwriting, producing scripts for Doctors and Family Affairs, appearing in the latter as Diane Short.

Career
She played Dr. Monica Broome in the first series of Cardiac Arrest and DC Grace Harris in the first two series of Thief Takers. She had a recurring role in the third series of Cold Feet as Emma Keaton and returned to medical dramas in 2006, playing Dr. Christine Whelan in The Golden Hour. In 2007, she starred as Nita in the BBC One series True Dare Kiss, and later that year began a recurring role in EastEnders as Rachel Branning, taking over the character from Sukie Smith. In February 2008, she played the spoken title role in a City of Birmingham Symphony Orchestra production of Stravinsky's Perséphone, broadcast on BBC Radio 3. In July 2008, she appeared in an episode of the ITV murder mystery series, Midsomer Murders as journalist Julie Benson, and in an episode of George Gently entitled "The Burning Man", playing the character Wanda Lane. In March 2010, she appeared as Maureen in BBC One's second series of Five Days. She also played the spaceship captain in the Doctor Who 2010 Christmas special, "A Christmas Carol". In November 2010, she appeared as Christopher Eccleston's character's wife in Jimmy McGovern's Accused.
She has also played a pregnant woman in an episode of Not Going Out. From 2014 to 2015, she played the role of Olga Fitzgerald, Geography teacher and Headteacher Vaughan Fitzgerald's estranged wife in BBC's Waterloo Road. The following year she played Dorothea Ames, Head teacher at Coal Hill Academy, in the BBC3 series Class, and provided the voice of Yuria of Londor in the video game Dark Souls III. She played Louise Wilson in BBC's The A Word, and reprised the role more prominently in its spin-off series Ralph & Katie.

Personal life
Quesnel practises kickboxing, tai chi, and flamenco dancing. In 2017, Quesnel won bronze at the British Council for Chinese Martial Arts (BCCMA) annual British Tai Chi Championships in the Open Weapon category for her Wudang t'ai chi ch'uan jian routine.

Filmography

Film and television

Stage

Video games

References

External links
Official website
Pooky Quesnel at the British Film Institute

1966 births
Living people
English television actresses
English women singers
English screenwriters
English stage actresses
English film actresses
English soap opera actresses
British women screenwriters
English television writers
British women television writers
English people of Trinidad and Tobago descent
Alumni of the University of Oxford
Alumni of the Academy of Live and Recorded Arts
People from Eccles, Greater Manchester
Actresses from Salford
Actresses from Lancashire
20th-century English actresses
21st-century English actresses
21st-century English women writers
21st-century British screenwriters